The year 1964 in film involved some significant events, including three highly successful musical films, Mary Poppins, My Fair Lady, and The Umbrellas of Cherbourg.

Top-grossing films (U.S.)

The top ten 1964 released films by box office gross in North America are as follows:

Events
 January 29 – 50-year-old actor Alan Ladd is found dead in bed at his home in Palm Springs, California. An autopsy confirms the cause of death as cerebral edema caused by an acute overdose of "alcohol and three other drugs" His death is ruled accidental. Ladd's final film, The Carpetbaggers, is released in April and, despite mostly negative reviews from critics, becomes a major commercial success.
 March 6 – Elvis Presley's 14th motion picture, Kissin' Cousins, is released to theaters.
 March 15 - Elizabeth Taylor marries Richard Burton.
 June 3 - The animated film Hey There, It's Yogi Bear! is released. Not only it is the first theatrical feature produced by Hanna-Barbera but also the first full-length theatrical animated film based on the television program.
 July 6 – A Hard Day's Night, the first Beatles film, premieres.
 August 27 – The film Mary Poppins is released. Not only is it a massive hit with both critics and audiences, but it also becomes Disney's highest-grossing film of all time. It goes on to win five Academy Awards, including Best Actress for Julie Andrews.
 October – In Photoplay magazine, Hedda Hopper announces that Sophia Loren and Paul Newman will star in the film version of Arthur Miller's play After the Fall, with Loren in the role that was written about Marilyn Monroe. The film is never made.

Awards
Academy Awards:

Best Picture: My Fair Lady – Warner Bros.
Best Director: George Cukor – My Fair Lady
Best Actor: Rex Harrison – My Fair Lady
Best Actress: Julie Andrews – Mary Poppins
Best Supporting Actor: Peter Ustinov – Topkapi
Best Supporting Actress: Lila Kedrova – Zorba the Greek
Best Foreign Language Film: Yesterday, Today and Tomorrow (Ieri, oggi, domani), directed by Vittorio De Sica, Italy

Golden Globe Awards:

Drama:
Best Picture: Becket
Best Actor: Peter O'Toole – Becket
Best Actress: Anne Bancroft – The Pumpkin Eater

Comedy or Musical:
Best Picture: My Fair Lady
Best Actor: Rex Harrison – My Fair Lady
Best Actress: Julie Andrews – Mary Poppins

Other
Best Supporting Actor: Edmond O'Brien – Seven Days in May
Best Supporting Actress: Agnes Moorehead – Hush...Hush, Sweet Charlotte
Best Director: George Cukor – My Fair Lady

Palme d'Or (Cannes Film Festival):
Les Parapluies de Cherbourg (The Umbrellas of Cherbourg), directed by Jacques Demy, France

Golden Lion (Venice Film Festival):
Il deserto rosso (The Red Desert), directed by Michelangelo Antonioni, Italy

Golden Bear (Berlin Film Festival):
Susuz Yaz (Dry Summer), directed by Ismail Metin, Turkey

1964 film releases
United States unless stated

January–March
January 1964
19 January
Strait-Jacket
22 January
The Comedy of Terrors
Pyro... The Thing Without a Face
Zulu
29 January
Dr. Strangelove
Man's Favorite Sport?
30 January
A Global Affair
Surf Party
February 1964
5 February
Man in the Middle
10 February
The Incredibly Strange Creatures Who Stopped Living and Became Mixed-Up Zombies
12 February
Seven Days in May
19 February
Dead Ringer
Les Parapluies de Cherbourg 
24 February
Crack in the World
26 February
He Rides Tall
March 1964
6 March
Kissin' Cousins
8 March
The Last Man on Earth (United States/Italy)
11 March
Becket 
Mail Order Bride
12 March
A Tiger Walks
18 March
7 Faces of Dr. Lao
The Flesh Eaters
Law of the Lawless
The Pink Panther
19 March
Two Thousand Maniacs!
The World of Henry Orient
25 March
Flight from Ashiya
The Misadventures of Merlin Jones
Muscle Beach Party
26 March
The Fall of the Roman Empire
28 March
The Incredible Mr. Limpet

April–June
April 1964
1 April
The Curse of the Living Corpse
Gunfighters of Casa Grande
3 April
Dark Purpose
5 April
The Best Man
8 April
Paris When It Sizzles
The Strangler
9 April
The Carpetbaggers
14 April
The Quick Gun
21 April
The Chalk Garden
French Dressing
28 April
The Third Secret
Woman of Straw
29 April
Mothra vs. Godzilla (Japan)
May 1964
2 May
The Bargee
The Thin Red Line
6 May
The Visit
11 May
What a Way to Go!
13 May
The Eyes of Annie Jones
14 May
Girl with Green Eyes
19 May
Signpost to Murder
20 May
Black Like Me
The Brass Bottle
Rhino!
Viva Las Vegas
27 May
A Distant Trumpet
29 May
3 Nuts in Search of a Bolt
June 1964
1 June
The Horror of Party Beach
The New Interns
3 June
For Those Who Think Young
Hey There, It's Yogi Bear!
Honeymoon Hotel
4 June
633 Squadron
The Three Lives of Thomasina
10 June
Advance to the Rear
Bedtime Story
McHale's Navy
Wild and Wonderful
11 June
The Unsinkable Molly Brown
17 June
Robinson Crusoe on Mars
23 June
A Shot in the Dark
The Young Lovers
24 June
Flipper's New Adventure
The Masque of the Red Death
Robin and the 7 Hoods
25 June
Circus World
26 June
The Cavern

July–September
July 1964
2 July
The Moon-Spinners
The Pawnbroker
3 July
Island of the Blue Dolphins 
6 July
A Hard Day's Night 
7 July
The Killers
8 July
Lady in a Cage
22 July
Bikini Beach
Good Neighbor Sam
Marnie
Shock Treatment
29 July
Carry On Spying
One Potato, Two Potato
August 1964
5 August
Ride the Wild Surf
6 August
The Night of the Iguana
11 August
Crooks in Cloisters
Dogora (Japan)
12 August
A House Is Not a Home
The Patsy
14 August
Behold a Pale Horse
16 August
Diary of a Bachelor
26 August
The Beauty Jungle
I'd Rather Be Rich
27 August
Mary Poppins
September 1964
2 September
The 7th Dawn
Bullet for a Badman
The Comedy Man
Topkapi
4 September
The Gospel According to St. Matthew (Italy)
11 September
Lorna
12 September
A Fistful of Dollars (Italy)
16 September
The Secret Invasion
18 September
Goldfinger 
19 September
Nothing but a Man 
25 September
Fanny Hill
27 September
Lilith

October–December
October 1964
3 October
Cheyenne Autumn
7 October
Fail-Safe
8 October
The Outrage
11 October
Blood on the Arrow
The System
14 October
Invitation to a Gunfighter
Send Me No Flowers
20 October
The Black Torment
24 October
The Lively Set
27 October
The Americanization of Emily
28 October
Rio Conchos
29 October
The Naked Kiss
The Time Travelers
The Train
November 1964
2 November
 Where Love Has Gone
4 November
Kitten with a Whip
Youngblood Hawke
Your Cheatin' Heart
5 November
Flight to Fury
8 November
Fate Is the Hunter
9 November
My Fair Lady
10 November
Roustabout
Stage to Thunder Rock
11 November
Pajama Party
15 November
Back Door to Hell
18 November
Goodbye Charlie
21 November
Four Days in November
25 November
Ensign Pulver
26 November
Apache Rifles
27 November
Looking for Love
December 1964
3 December
Dear Heart
4 December
Kisses for My President
10 December
Carry On Cleo
Father Goose
The Golden Head
12 December
Raiders from Beneath the Sea
16 December
The Disorderly Orderly
Hush...Hush, Sweet Charlotte
Zorba the Greek
18 December
Emil and the Detectives
Get Yourself a College Girl
20 December
Ghidorah, the Three-Headed Monster (Japan)
22 December
Kiss Me, Stupid
25 December
The Pleasure Seekers
Sex and the Single Girl
28 December
Carol for Another Christmas
30 December
The Night Walker

Notable films released in 1964
United States unless stated

#
 3 Nuts in Search of a Bolt, starring Mamie Van Doren and Tommy Noonan
 7 Faces of Dr. Lao, starring Tony Randall, Barbara Eden and Arthur O'Connell, with special effects by George Pal
 The 7th Dawn, starring William Holden and Susannah York
 633 Squadron, starring Cliff Robertson, George Chakiris and Maria Perschy – (U.K.)

A
 Adobe and Mirror, directed by Ebrahim Golestan, starring Mohammad Ali Keshavarz, Jamshid Mashayekhi and Pari Saberi (Iran)
 Advance to the Rear, directed by George Marshall, starring Glenn Ford, Stella Stevens and Melvyn Douglas
 Adventures of Zatoichi (Zatōichi sekisho-yaburi), directed by Kimiyoshi Yasuda – (Japan)
Ali Baba and the Seven Saracens
 The Alive and the Dead (Zhivye i myortvye) – (U.S.S.R.)
 All These Women (För att inte tala om alla dessa kvinnor), directed by Ingmar Bergman – (Sweden)
The Americanization of Emily, directed by Arthur Hiller, starring James Garner and Julie Andrews
Anatomy of a Marriage: My Days with Françoise, directed by André Cayatte – (France)
Anatomy of a Marriage: My Days with Jean-Marc, directed by André Cayatte – (France)
 The Ape Woman (La donna scimmia), starring Ugo Tognazzi and Annie Girardot – (Italy/France)
 Assassination (Ansatu) – (Japan)
 At Midnight I'll Take Your Soul (À Meia-Noite Levarei Sua Alma) – (Brazil)
 Atentát – (Czechoslovakia)
 A Trip to the Moon
 Ayee Milan Ki Bela – (India)

B
 Back Door to Hell, starring Jimmie Rodgers and Jack Nicholson
 Backfire (Échappement libre), starring Jean-Paul Belmondo and Jean Seberg – (France)
 Ballad in Blue, directed by Paul Henreid and starring Ray Charles
 Band of Outsiders (Bande à part), directed by Jean-Luc Godard – (France)
 The Bargee, starring Harry H. Corbett and Eric Sykes – (U.K.)
 The Beauty Jungle, starring Ian Hendry – (U.K.)
 Becket, directed by Peter Glenville, starring Peter O'Toole and Richard Burton – (U.K./U.S.)
 Bedtime Story, starring Marlon Brando, David Niven and Shirley Jones
 Before the Revolution (Prima della rivoluzione), directed by Bernardo Bertolucci – (Italy)
 Behold a Pale Horse, directed by Fred Zinnemann, starring Gregory Peck, Anthony Quinn, Omar Sharif
 Belarmino, a Cinema Novo docufiction – (Portugal)
 The Best Man, directed by Franklin J. Schaffner, written by Gore Vidal, starring Henry Fonda and Cliff Robertson
Bikini Beach, starring Frankie Avalon, Annette Funicello, Martha Hyer and Don Rickles
 Black God, White Devil (Deus e o Diabo na terra do sol) – (Brazil)
 Black Like Me, starring James Whitmore and Roscoe Lee Browne
 Black Peter (Cerný Petr), directed by Miloš Forman – (Czechoslovakia)
 The Black Torment, directed by Robert Hartford-Davis – (U.K.)
 Blood and Black Lace (6 donne per l'assassino), directed by Mario Bava – (Italy)
 Blood on the Arrow, directed by Sidney Salkow and starring Dale Robertson and Martha Hyer
 La bonne soupe (a.k.a. Careless Love), directed by Robert Thomas – (Italy/France)
The Brass Bottle, starring Tony Randall, Burl Ives and Barbara Eden
 Bullet for a Badman, starring Audie Murphy, Darren McGavin and Ruta Lee

C
 A Carol for Another Christmas, starring Peter Sellers and Britt Ekland
 The Carpetbaggers, starring George Peppard, Carroll Baker and Elizabeth Ashley
 Carry On Cleo, starring Sid James and Amanda Barrie – (U.K.)
 Carry On Spying, starring Kenneth Williams and Barbara Windsor – (U.K.)
 Castle of Blood (Danza macabra), directed by Antonio Margheriti and Sergio Corbucci – (Italy/France)
 Castle of the Living Dead (Il castello dei morti vivi), directed by Warren Kiefer – (Italy/France)
 The Chairman (Predsedatel) – (U.S.S.R.)
 The Chalk Garden, starring Deborah Kerr and Hayley Mills – (U.K.)
 Charulata, directed by Satyajit Ray – (India)
 Cheyenne Autumn, directed by John Ford, starring Carroll Baker, Richard Widmark, Edward G. Robinson and Karl Malden
 Circle of Love (La ronde), directed by Roger Vadim and starring Jane Fonda – (France)
 Circus World, starring John Wayne, Claudia Cardinale and Rita Hayworth
 The Comedy Man, starring Kenneth More and Cecil Parker – (U.K.)
 The Comedy of Terrors, starring Vincent Price, Peter Lorre, Boris Karloff, Basil Rathbone
Crooks in Cloisters, starring Ronald Fraser and Barbara Windsor – (U.K.)
 The Curse of the Hidden Vault (Die Gruft mit dem Rätselschloß), directed by Franz Josef Gottlieb – (West Germany)
 The Curse of the Living Corpse, produced, written and directed by Del Tenney
 The Curse of the Mummy's Tomb, directed by Michael Carreras – (U.K.)

D
 Dark Purpose, starring Shirley Jones
 Dead Ringer, starring Bette Davis, Peter Lawford
 Dear Heart, directed by Delbert Mann, starring Geraldine Page, Glenn Ford and Angela Lansbury
 Dear John (Käre John), directed by Lars-Magnus Lindgren – (Sweden)
 Devil Doll, directed by Lindsay Shonteff – (U.K.)
 The Devil-Ship Pirates, starring Christopher Lee and Andrew Keir
 Diamonds of the Night (Démanty noci), directed by Jan Němec – (Czechoslovakia)
 Diary of a Bachelor, directed by Sandy Howard, starring William Traylor, Joe Silver and Dagne Crane
 Diary of a Chambermaid (Le journal d'une femme de chambre), directed by Luis Buñuel, starring Jeanne Moreau and Michel Piccoli – (France)
 The Disorderly Orderly, directed by Frank Tashlin, starring Jerry Lewis and Susan Oliver
 A Distant Trumpet, starring Troy Donahue, Suzanne Pleshette and Diane McBain
 Dog Eat Dog (Einer frisst den anderen), starring Jayne Mansfield – (West Germany/Italy/Liechtenstein)
 Dogora (a.k.a. Uchū Daikaijū Dogora), directed by Ishirō Honda – (Japan)
 Dosti (Friendship), directed by Satyen Bose – (India)
Dr. Crippen, starring Donald Pleasence – (U.K.)
Dr. Sex, directed by Ted V. Mikels
 Dr. Strangelove or: How I Learned to Stop Worrying and Love the Bomb, directed by Stanley Kubrick, starring Peter Sellers (in three roles) and George C. Scott – (U.K.)
Dry Summer (Susuz Yaz), directed by Metin Erksan – (Turkey)

E
 The Earth Dies Screaming, starring Willard Parker, Virginia Field and Dennis Price – (U.K.)
 East of Sudan, starring Anthony Quayle, Sylvia Syms and Jenny Agutter – (U.K.)
 Empire, directed by Andy Warhol
 Ensign Pulver, a sequel to Mister Roberts, starring Robert Walker Jr. and Burl Ives
 El extraño viaje (The Strange Voyage), directed by Fernando Fernán Gómez – (Spain)
 The Evil of Frankenstein, directed by Freddie Francis – (U.K.)
 The Evil Stairs (마의 계단, Ma-ui gyedan), directed by Lee Man-hee – (South Korea)
 The Eyes of Annie Jones, starring Richard Conte and Francesca Annis – (U.K.)

F
 Face of the Screaming Werewolf, starring Lon Chaney – (Mexico/U.S.)
 Fail-Safe, directed by Sidney Lumet, starring Henry Fonda, Dan O'Herlihy and Walter Matthau
 The Fall of the Roman Empire, starring Sophia Loren, Stephen Boyd and Alec Guinness
 Fanny Hill, directed by Russ Meyer – (West Germany/U.S.)
 Fantômas, starring Jean Marais – (France)
 Fate Is the Hunter, starring Glenn Ford, Rod Taylor and Suzanne Pleshette
 Father Came Too!, starring James Robertson Justice, Leslie Phillips and Stanley Baxter – (U.K.)
 Father Goose, starring Cary Grant, Leslie Caron and Trevor Howard
 Father of a Soldier (Jariskats'is mama), directed by Revaz Chkheidze – (Georgia)
 The Fifth Horseman Is Fear (A Paty Jezdec je Strach), directed by Zbyněk Brynych – (Czechoslovakia)
 Fight, Zatoichi, Fight (Zatōichi kesshō-tabi), directed by Kenji Misumi – (Japan)
 First Men in the Moon, starring Edward Judd and Lionel Jeffries, with special effects by Ray Harryhausen – (U.K.)
 A Fistful of Dollars, directed by Sergio Leone, starring Clint Eastwood – (Italy)
 The Flesh Eaters, starring Martin Kosleck
 Flight from Ashiya, starring Yul Brynner and Richard Widmark
  Flipper's New Adventure, starring Luke Halpin and Pamela Franklin
 The Flower and the Angry Waves (Hana to dotō), directed by Seijun Suzuki – (Japan)
 For Men Only, directed by Mahmoud Zulfikar, starring Soad Hosny and Nadia Lutfi – (Egypt)
 For Those Who Think Young, starring Pamela Tiffin and James Darren
 Forest of the Hanged (Pădurea spânzuraţilor), directed by Liviu Ciulei – (Romania)
 Four Days in November, a documentary directed by Mel Stuart

G
 Gate of Flesh (Nikutai no mon), directed by Seijun Suzuki – (Japan)
Gertrud, directed by Carl Theodor Dreyer – (Denmark)
 Get Yourself a College Girl, starring Mary Ann Mobley and Nancy Sinatra
 Ghidorah, the Three-Headed Monster (San Daikaijū: Chikyū Saidai no Kessen) – (Japan)
 The Ghost of Sierra de Cobre, starring Martin Landau, Judith Anderson and Diane Baker
 Girl with Green Eyes, starring Peter Finch and Rita Tushingham – (U.K.)
 A Global Affair, starring Bob Hope
 Goldfinger, starring Sean Connery as James Bond), with Honor Blackman, Shirley Eaton and Gert Fröbe – (U.K.)
 Goodbye Charlie, starring Debbie Reynolds, Tony Curtis and Pat Boone
 Good Neighbor Sam, starring Jack Lemmon and Romy Schneider
 The Gorgon, starring Peter Cushing, Barbara Shelley and Christopher Lee – (U.K.)
 The Gospel According to St. Matthew (Il vangelo secondo Matteo), directed by Pier Paolo Pasolini – (Italy)
 Greed in the Sun (Cent mille dollars au soleil), starring Jean-Paul Belmondo – (France)
 The Guns (Os Fuzis), directed by Ruy Guerra – (Brazil/Argentina)
 Guns at Batasi, starring Richard Attenborough and Jack Hawkins – (U.K.)
 The Guns of August, a documentary directed by Nathan Kroll and narrated by Fritz Weaver

H
 Hamlet (a.k.a. Richard Burton's Hamlet), starring Richard Burton
 Hamlet – (U.S.S.R.)
 Haqeeqat (Reality) – (India)
 A Hard Day's Night, directed by Richard Lester, starring the Beatles – (U.K.)
 Hey There, It's Yogi Bear!, a Hanna-Barbera feature production
 Hide and Seek, starring Ian Carmichael and Curd Jürgens – (U.K.)
 High Infidelity (Alta infedeltà), starring Nino Manfredi – (Italy)
 Honeymoon Hotel, starring Robert Morse and Robert Goulet
 The Horror of Party Beach, directed by Del Tenney
 Hot Enough for June, starring Dirk Bogarde and Sylva Koscina – (U.K.)
 A House Is Not a Home, starring Shelley Winters and Robert Taylor
 Hush… Hush, Sweet Charlotte, directed by Robert Aldrich, starring Bette Davis and Olivia de Havilland

I
 I Am Cuba (Soy Cuba), directed by Mikhail Kalatozov – (Cuba/U.S.S.R.)iams
 The Incredible Mr. Limpet, starring Don Knotts, Jack Weston and Andrew Duggan
 Intentions of Murder (Akai satsui), directed by Shōhei Imamura – (Japan)
 Invitation to a Gunfighter, starring Yul Brynner, George Segal, Janice Rule
 It's Not Just You, Murray!, a short film directed by Martin Scorsese
 Italiani brava gente, directed by Giuseppe De Santis – (Italy)

J
 Joseph Kilian (Postava k podpírání), directed by Pavel Juráček and Jan Schmidt – (Czechoslovakia)
 Joy House (Les felins), directed by René Clément, starring Alain Delon and Jane Fonda – (France)

K
 The Killers, directed by Don Siegel, starring Lee Marvin, Angie Dickinson, John Cassavetes and, in his final film, Ronald Reagan
 King & Country, directed by Joseph Losey, starring Dirk Bogarde and Tom Courtenay – (U.K.)
Kiss Me Quick!, starring Althea Currier
 Kiss Me, Stupid, directed by Billy Wilder, starring Dean Martin and Kim Novak
 Kisses for My President, starring Polly Bergen and Fred MacMurray
 Kissin' Cousins, starring Elvis Presley and Yvonne Craig
 Kitten with a Whip, starring Ann-Margret and John Forsythe
 Kwaidan, directed by Masaki Kobayashi – (Japan)

L
 Lady General Hua Mu-lan (a.k.a. Hua Mu Lan) – (Hong Kong)
 Lady in a Cage, directed by Walter Grauman, starring Olivia de Havilland and James Caan
 Lana, Queen of the Amazons (Lana - Königin der Amazonen), starring Catherine Schell – (West Germany/Brazil)
 The Last Gun (Jim il primo), directed by Sergio Bergonzelli – (Italy)
The Last Man on Earth (L'ultimo uomo della terra), starring Vincent Price – (United States/Italy)
 The Last Steps (Les pas perdus), starring Michèle Morgan and Jean-Louis Trintignant – (France)
 Leader, starring Dilip Kumar and Vyjayanthimala – (India)
 The Leather Boys, directed by Sidney J. Furie, starring Rita Tushingham – (U.K.)
 Lemonade Joe (Limonádový Joe aneb Koňská opera), directed by Oldřich Lipský – (Czechoslovakia)
 Let's Talk About Women (Se permettete parliamo di donne), directed by Ettore Scola – (Italy)
 Lilith, directed by Robert Rossen, starring Warren Beatty and Jean Seberg
The Lively Set, starring James Darren, Pamela Tiffin and Doug McClure
London in the Raw, a documentary about London nightlife – (U.K.)
 The Lonely Wife (Charulata), directed by Satyajit Ray – (India)
 The Long Hair of Death (I lunghi capelli della morte), directed by Antonio Margheriti – (Italy)
 The Long Ships, starring Richard Widmark and Sidney Poitier – (U.K./Yugoslavia)
 Looking for Love, starring Connie Francis
 Lorna, directed by Russ Meyer
 Love in 4 Dimensions (Amore in 4 dimensioni), directed by Mino Guerrini – (Italy)
 Loving Couples (Älskande par), directed by Mai Zetterling – (Sweden)
 The Luck of Ginger Coffey, directed by Irvin Kershner, starring Robert Shaw

M
 Madu Tiga (Three Wives), starring P. Ramlee – (Malaysia)
 The Magnificent Cuckold (Il magnifico cornuto), directed by Antonio Pietrangeli – (Italy)
 Mail Order Bride, directed by Burt Kennedy, starring Buddy Ebsen and Lois Nettleton
 Male Companion (Un monsieur de compagnie), directed by Philippe de Broca – (France)
 Male Hunt (La chasse à l'homme), starring Jean-Paul Belmondo – (France/Italy)
 Man in the Middle, starring Robert Mitchum
 Man's Favorite Sport?, directed by Howard Hawks, starring Rock Hudson and Paula Prentiss
 Marnie, directed by Alfred Hitchcock, starring Tippi Hedren and Sean Connery
 Marriage Italian Style (Matrimonio all'italiana), directed by Vittorio De Sica, starring Sophia Loren and Marcello Mastroianni – (Italy)
 A Married Woman (Une femme mariée), directed by Jean-Luc Godard – (France)
 Mary Poppins, starring Julie Andrews and Dick Van Dyke
 The Masque of the Red Death, starring Vincent Price, Hazel Court and Jane Asher – (U.K.)
 McHale's Navy, based on the television sitcom of the same name, starring Ernest Borgnine
 Men and Women (Noite Vazia), directed by Walter Hugo Khouri – (Brazil)
 The Misadventures of Merlin Jones, starring Annette Funicello and Tommy Kirk
 The Moon-Spinners, starring Hayley Mills
 Mothra vs. Godzilla (Godzilla vs. The Thing), directed by Ishirō Honda – (Japan)
 Murder Ahoy!, starring Margaret Rutherford and Lionel Jeffries
 Murder Most Foul, starring Margaret Rutherford and Ron Moody
 My Fair Lady, directed by George Cukor, starring Audrey Hepburn and Rex Harrison
 My Friend Lefterakis (O filos mou o Lefterakis) – (Greece)

N
 The Naked Kiss, directed by Samuel Fuller, starring Constance Towers
 The New Interns, starring Dean Jones and Michael Callan
 Night Must Fall, starring Albert Finney, Mona Washbourne and Susan Hampshire – (U.K.)
 The Night of the Iguana, directed by John Huston, starring Richard Burton, Ava Gardner, Deborah Kerr and Sue Lyon
 Night Train to Paris, starring Leslie Nielsen, Aliza Gur and Dorinda Stevens – (U.S./U.K.)
The Night Walker, starring Barbara Stanwyck (her last film) and Robert Taylor
Nightmare, directed by Freddie Francis – (U.K.)
 Nobody Waved Good-bye, directed by Don Owen – (Canada)
Nothing But a Man, starring Ivan Dixon, Abbey Lincoln and Yaphet Kotto
 Nothing But the Best, starring Alan Bates and Millicent Martin – (U.K.)

O
 Of Human Bondage, starring Kim Novak, Laurence Harvey and Siobhán McKenna – (U.K.)
 One Potato, Two Potato, starring Barbara Barrie, Bernie Hamilton and Richard Mulligan
 Onibaba (Demon Woman), directed by Kaneto Shindo – (Japan)
 The Outrage, directed by Martin Ritt, starring Paul Newman, Laurence Harvey, Claire Bloom and Edward G. Robinson

P
 Pajama Party, starring Annette Funicello and Tommy Kirk
 Pale Flower (Kawaita hana) – (Japan)
 Panic Button, starring Jayne Mansfield and Maurice Chevalier
 Paris When It Sizzles, starring William Holden and Audrey Hepburn
 The Patsy, directed by and starring Jerry Lewis
 The Pawnbroker, directed by Sidney Lumet, starring Rod Steiger, Geraldine Fitzgerald and Brock Peters
 The Pleasure Seekers, starring Pamela Tiffin, Carol Lynley, Brian Keith, Tony Franciosa and Ann-Margret
 Point of Order!, a documentary directed by Emile de Antonio
 Psyche 59, directed by Alexander Singer – (U.K.)
 The Pumpkin Eater, starring Anne Bancroft and Peter Finch – (U.K.)

Q
Quick, Before It Melts, starring George Maharis, Robert Morse, Anjanette Comer and Yvonne Craig
The Quick Gun, starring Audie Murphy

R
 Raiders from Beneath the Sea, starring Ken Scott and Merry Anders
 Rattle of a Simple Man directed by Muriel Box, starring Diane Cilento and Harry H. Corbett – (U.K.)
 The Ravishing Idiot (Une ravissante idiote), starring Brigitte Bardot and Anthony Perkins – (France)
 Red Desert (Il deserto rosso), directed by Michelangelo Antonioni, starring Monica Vitti and Richard Harris – (Italy)
 Rhino!, starring Robert Culp
 Ride the Wild Surf, starring Tab Hunter, Fabian Forte, Shelley Fabares and Barbara Eden
 Ring of Spies, starring Bernard Lee – (U.K.)
 Rio Conchos, starring Stuart Whitman, Tony Franciosa, Richard Boone and Wende Wagner
 Robin and the 7 Hoods, starring Frank Sinatra, Dean Martin, Sammy Davis, Jr. and Bing Crosby
 Robinson Crusoe on Mars, directed by Byron Haskin, starring Paul Mantee, Vic Lundin and Adam West
 Room 13 (Zimmer 13), directed by Harald Reinl – (Denmark/France/West Germany)
 Roustabout, starring Elvis Presley and Barbara Stanwyck
 Rudolph the Red-Nosed Reindeer – TV film by Rankin/Bass Productions

S
 Sallah Shabati, starring Chaim Topol – (Israel)
 Sangam, starring Vyjayanthimala, Raj Kapoor and Rajendra Kumar – (India)
 Santa Claus Conquers the Martians, directed by Nicholas Webster
 Séance on a Wet Afternoon, starring Kim Stanley and Richard Attenborough – (U.K.)
 The Secret Invasion, starring Stewart Granger and Mickey Rooney
 Seduced and Abandoned (Sedotta e abbandonata), starring Stefania Sandrelli – (Italy)
 Send Me No Flowers, starring Doris Day and Rock Hudson
 Seven Days in May, directed by John Frankenheimer, starring Kirk Douglas, Burt Lancaster, Fredric March and Ava Gardner
 Seven Up!, a documentary directed by Paul Almond – (U.K.)
 Sex and the Single Girl, starring Natalie Wood, Tony Curtis, Henry Fonda and Lauren Bacall
 Shehar Aur Sapna (The City and the Dream), directed by Khwaja Ahmad Abbas – (India)
 A Shot in the Dark, second Pink Panther film, directed by Blake Edwards. starring Peter Sellers and Elke Sommer  – (U.K./U.S.)
 Sleep, by Andy Warhol
 Smokescreen, starring Yvonne Romain
 The Soft Skin (La peau douce), directed by François Truffaut, starring Françoise Dorléac – (France)
 Strait-Jacket, directed by William Castle, starring Joan Crawford and Diane Baker
 Swedish Wedding Night (Bröllopsbesvär), directed by Åke Falck – (Sweden)
 The System, starring Oliver Reed

T
 T.A.M.I. Show, a concert film filmed at the Santa Monica Civic Auditorium
 That Man from Rio (L'Homme de Rio), starring Jean-Paul Belmondo and Françoise Dorléac – (France)
 The Thin Red Line, starring Keir Dullea and Jack Warden
 This Is My Street, directed by Sidney Hayers – (U.K.)
 The Three Lives of Thomasina, starring Patrick McGoohan and Susan Hampshire – (UK/US)
The Third Secret, starring Stephen Boyd and Pamela Franklin – (U.K.)
Those Calloways, produced by Walt Disney and directed by Norman Tokar
 Three Outlaw Samurai (Sanbiki no samurai) – (Japan)
 La Tía Tula (Aunt Tula) – (Spain)
 A Tiger Walks, starring Brian Keith and Vera Miles
 Time of Indifference (Gli indifferenti), starring Claudia Cardinale, Rod Steiger and Shelley Winters – (Italy)
 The Time Travelers, starring Preston Foster and Merry Anders
 Tintin and the Blue Oranges (Tintin et les oranges bleues), starring Jean-Pierre Talbot – (France)
 To the Moon and Beyond, a film created for the 1964 New York World's Fair
 The Tomb of Ligeia, directed by Roger Corman, starring Vincent Price and Elizabeth Shepherd
 Topkapi, starring Melina Mercouri, Maximilian Schell and Peter Ustinov
 The Train, directed by John Frankenheimer, starring Burt Lancaster, Paul Scofield and Jeanne Moreau – (U.S./France/Italy)
 The Troops of Saint-Tropez (Le gendarme de Saint-Tropez), directed by Jean Girault – (France)
 Troubled Waters, (a.k.a. Man with Two Faces), starring Tab Hunter – (U.K.)
Two Stage Sisters (Wŭtái Jiěmèi), directed by Xie Jin – (China)
 Two Thousand Maniacs!, directed by Herschell Gordon Lewis

U
 The Umbrellas of Cherbourg (Les parapluies de Cherbourg), directed by Jacques Demy, starring Catherine Deneuve and Nino Castelnuovo – (France)
 The Unsinkable Molly Brown, starring Debbie Reynolds, Harve Presnell and Ed Begley
 The Unvanquished (L'insoumis), starring Alain Delon – (France)

V
 The Visit, directed by Bernhard Wicki – (West Germany/U.S./France/Italy)
 Viva Las Vegas, starring Elvis Presley and Ann-Margret

W
 Weekend at Dunkirk (Week-end à Zuydcoote), directed by Henri Verneuil – (Italy/France)
 Welcome, or No Trespassing, starring Yevgeniy Yevstigneyev – (U.S.S.R.)
 What a Way to Go!, starring Shirley MacLaine, Paul Newman, Robert Mitchum, Dean Martin, Gene Kelly, Bob Cummings and Dick Van Dyke
Where Love Has Gone, starring Bette Davis and Susan Hayward
 Whirlwind (Shikonmado – Dai tatsumaki), directed by Hiroshi Inagaki – (Japan)
 White Voices (Le voci bianche), directed by Pasquale Festa Campanile and Massimo Franciosa – (Italy)
 Wild and Wonderful, starring Tony Curtis and Christine Kaufmann
 Wild West Story starring Carl-Gustaf Lindstedt, Lena Granhagen and Gerald Mohr
 Witchcraft, starring Lon Chaney and Jack Hedley – (U.K.)
 Woh Kaun Thi? (Who Was She?) – (India)
 Woman in the Dunes (Suna no onna), directed by Hiroshi Teshigahara – (Japan)
 Woman of Straw, starring Gina Lollobrigida and Sean Connery – (U.K.)
 World Without Sun (Le monde sans soleil), directed by Jacques-Yves Cousteau – (France)
 The World's Most Beautiful Swindlers (Les plus belles escroqueries du monde), composed of five segments – (France)
 Wonderful Life (U.S. title: Swingers' Paradise), starring Cliff Richard and the Shadows – (U.K.)
The World of Henry Orient, directed by George Roy Hill, starring Peter Sellers, Paula Prentiss and Angela Lansbury

Y
 Yearning (Midareru), directed by Mikio Naruse – (Japan)
 The Yellow Rolls-Royce, starring Rex Harrison and Jeanne Moreau – (U.K.)
 The Young Lovers, starring Peter Fonda and Sharon Hugueny
Youngblood Hawke, starring James Franciscus, Suzanne Pleshette and Geneviève Page
 Your Cheatin' Heart, a biopic of Hank Williams, starring George Hamilton

Z
 Zatoichi and the Chest of Gold (Zatōichi senryō-kubi), directed by Kazuo Ikehiro – (Japan)
 Zatoichi's Flashing Sword (Zatōichi abare dako), directed by Kazuo Ikehiro – (Japan)
 Zhavoronok (Жаворонок), starring Gennadi Yukhtin – (U.S.S.R.)
Zindagi, starring Vyjayanthimala, Rajendra Kumar, Raaj Kumar and Prithviraj Kapoor – (India)
Zogue fe Agaza, starring Salah Zulfikar and Laila Taher – (Egypt)
 Zorba the Greek, directed by Michael Cacoyannis, starring Anthony Quinn and Alan Bates – (Greece/U.K.)
 Zulu, directed by Cy Endfield, starring Stanley Baker, Michael Caine and Jack Hawkins – (U.K.)

Short film series
 Looney Tunes (1930–1969)
 Terrytoons (1930–1964)
 Merrie Melodies (1931–1969)
 Speedy Gonzales (1953–1968)
 Bugs Bunny (1940–1964)
 Woody Woodpecker (1940–1972)
 Chilly Willy (1953–1972)
 Loopy De Loop (1959–1965)

Births
 January 4 - David Bowe (actor), American character actor
 January 7 – Nicolas Cage, actor, producer and director
 January 13 – Penelope Ann Miller, actress
 January 14 - Mark Addy, English actor
 January 18 – Jane Horrocks, actress
 January 19 - Ty Granderson Jones, Creole American actor, screenwriter and producer
 January 23 - Mariska Hargitay, actress
 January 27 – Bridget Fonda, actress
 February 5 – Laura Linney, actress
 February 15 – Chris Farley, actor (d. 1997)
 February 16 – Christopher Eccleston, English actor
 February 18 – Matt Dillon, actor
 February 20
Willie Garson, American actor (d. 2021)
French Stewart, American actor
 February 21 - Adrian Schiller, English actor
 February 24 – Todd Field, director and actor
 February 25 - Lee Evans, English stand-up comedian and actor
 February 26 - Mark Dacascos, American actor and martial artist
 March 3 - Laura Harring, Mexican-American actress
 March 6 - Yvette Wilson, American actress and comedian (d. 2012)
 March 7 – Wanda Sykes, American actress, comedian and writer
 March 8 - Bob Bergen, American voice actor
 March 9 – Juliette Binoche, actress
 March 11
Emma Chambers, English actress (d. 2018)
Shane Richie, English actor, comedian, television presenter and singer
 March 17 – Rob Lowe, actor
 March 23 - Hope Davis, American actress
 March 27 - Clive Rowe, British actor
 March 29 - Elle Macpherson, Australian actress and model
 April 4 – David Cross, actor and comedian
 April 6 - Deborah Theaker, Canadian actress
 April 7 – Russell Crowe, actor
 April 8 - Biz Markie, American rapper and actor (d. 2021)
 April 12 - Mark Camacho, Canadian actor and voice actor
 April 13 - Caroline Rhea, Canadian-American actress, voice artist and stand-up comedian
 April 14 - Gina McKee, English actress
 April 16 - Boyd Banks, Canadian stand-up comedian and actor
 April 20 
 Crispin Glover, actor
 Andy Serkis, actor
 April 24 
Djimon Hounsou, actor
Cedric the Entertainer, actor and comedian
Gregory Sporleder, American actor and filmmaker
 April 25 – Hank Azaria, actor, voice actor, comedian and producer
 May 1 - Scott Coffey, American actor, director, producer and screenwriter
 May 5 - Don Payne (writer), American writer and producer (d. 2013)
 May 6 - Dana Hill, American actress (d. 1996)
 May 11 - Tim Blake Nelson, American actor, writer and director
 May 12
Tiffany Helm, American actress
Pierre Morel, French film director
 May 13
Stephen Colbert, American comedian, television host, and writer
Sakichi Sato, Japanese actor, director and screenwriter
Tom Verica, American actor, director and producer
 May 25 – Ray Stevenson, Irish actor
 May 26 - Lenny Kravitz, American singer, songwriter and actor
 May 27 - Adam Carolla, American radio personality, comedian, actor and podcaster
 June 7
Judie Aronson, American actress
Gia Carides, Australian actress
 June 9 – Gloria Reuben, actress/singer
 June 10 - Tony Martin (comedian), New Zealand comedian, writer and actor
 June 13
Kathy Burke, English actress, comedian, writer, producer, and director
Laura Kightlinger, American actress, comedian and writer
 June 15 – Courteney Cox, actress
 June 22 – Hiroshi Abe, actor and model
 June 23 - Joss Whedon, American filmmaker and composer
 June 26 - Ian Tracey, Canadian actor
 June 30
Ivan Trojan, Czech actor
Mark Waters, American screenwriter, director and producer
 July 1 - Peter Marquardt, American actor and video game producer (d. 2014)
 July 2 - Eric Michels, American actor (d. 2018)
 July 3
Peyton Reed, American director
Yeardley Smith, actress, voice actress, writer, author, comedian and painter
 July 7 - Tracy Reiner, American actress
 July 8 – Lam Suet, Hong Kong actor
 July 11 - Laura Cayouette, American actress, writer, producer and director
 July 16 – Canti Lau, Hong Kong actor
 July 17 - Heather Langenkamp, American actress, writer, director and producer
 July 19 - Peter Dobson, American actor
 July 20 – Dean Winters, American actor
 July 22
Adam Godley, English actor
David Spade, American actor, comedian, writer
 July 26 – Sandra Bullock, American actress
 July 28 — Lori Loughlin, actress
 July 30
Vivica A. Fox, American actress
Jim Wise, American actor, singer, writer and composer
 August 2 – Mary-Louise Parker, actress
 August 6 - Lisa Boyle, American actress and model
 August 7 - Tom McGrath (animator), American voice actor, animator, screenwriter and director
 August 10 - Una Damon, South Korean-American actress
 August 11 - Lawrence Monoson, American retired actor
 August 13 - Debi Mazar, American actress and television personality
 August 16 – William Salyers, actor and voice actor
 August 18 - Brian Stack, American actor, comedian and writer
 August 20 – Flaminia Cinque, English actress
 August 25 - Saverio Guerra, American actor
 August 27 - Robert Bogue, American actor
 August 29 - Dina Spybey, American actress
 August 30 - Nelson Ascencio, Cuban-American actor and comedian
 September 1 - Welker White, American actress
 September 2 – Keanu Reeves, Canadian actor
 September 5 – Thomas Mikal Ford, American actor (d. 2016)
 September 6 - Rosie Perez, American actress, community activist, talk show host, author, dancer and choreographer
 September 14
Stephen Dunham, American actor (d. 2012)
Faith Ford, American actress
 September 16 - Molly Shannon, American actress and comedian
 September 19 - Jennifer Cooke, American former actress
 September 20 - Maggie Cheung, Hong Kong actress
 September 24 - Adam Alexi-Malle, Italian actor and singer
 September 28 - Janeane Garofalo, American actress, voice artist, stand-up comedian and writer
 September 30 - Monica Bellucci, Italian actress and model
 October 3 – Clive Owen, English actor
 October 8 - Ian Hart, English actor
 October 9 - Guillermo del Toro, Mexican filmmaker
 October 10
Quinton Flynn, American film, television and voice actor
Tim Miller (director), American filmmaker
 October 13 - Matt Walsh (comedian), American comedian and actor
 October 14 - David Kaye, Canadian-American voice actor
 October 25 – Kevin Michael Richardson, American actor and voice actor
 October 26 - Danny Mastrogiorgio, American actor
 October 31 - Kirk Jones (director), English director and screenwriter
 November 5 - Famke Janssen, Dutch actress
 November 14 – Patrick Warburton, American actor and voice artist
 November 16 - Harry Lennix, American actor
 November 18 - Nadia Sawalha, British actress, television personality and YouTuber
 November 23 - Boyd Kestner, American actor
 November 29 – Don Cheadle, American actor
 November 30 - Richard Brake, Welsh-born American character actor
 December 3 - Lisanne Falk, American former actress and producer
 December 4 – Marisa Tomei, American actress
 December 8 – Teri Hatcher, American actress
 December 10 - Edith González, Mexican actress and dancer (d. 2019)
 December 19
Zhang Hanyu, Chinese actor
Ben Becker, German actor
 December 23 - Shelley Malil, American actor
 December 24 - Mark Valley, American actor
 December 27
Ian Gomez, American actor
Theresa Randle, American actress
 December 31 - Michael McDonald (comedian), American stand-up comedian, actor, screenwriter and director

Deaths
 January 21 - Joseph Schildkraut, 67, Austrian actor, The Diary of Anne Frank, The Life of Emile Zola, Viva Villa!
 January 22 – Lissy Arna, 63, German actress, Eva in Silk, The Dance Goes On
 January 27 – Norman Z. McLeod, 65, American director, The Paleface, The Secret Life of Walter Mitty
 January 29 – Alan Ladd, 50, American actor, Shane, The Blue Dahlia
 February 19 – Edward Gargan, 62, American actor, Little Miss Broadway, Adventures of Gallant Bess
 February 24 – Frank Conroy, 73, British actor, The Ox-Bow Incident, The Naked City
 February 27 – Orry-Kelly, 66, Australian costume designer, Casablanca, The Maltese Falcon
 February 29 – Frank Albertson, 55, American actor, It's a Wonderful Life, Psycho
 March 1 – Dennis Moore, 56, American actor, The Lone Rider and the Bandit, Overland Stagecoach
 March 4 – Edwin August, 80, American actor, director and screenwriter 
 March 10 – Arthur Hohl, 74, American actor, Cleopatra, Private Detective 62
 March 23 – Peter Lorre, 59, Hungarian actor, Casablanca, The Maltese Falcon
 April 18 – Ben Hecht, 70, American playwright and screenwriter, Notorious, His Girl Friday
 April 29 – J. M. Kerrigan, 79, Irish actor (Gone with the Wind)
 May 10 – Carol Haney, 39, American dancer, actress, The Pajama Game, Invitation to the Dance
 May 13 – Diana Wynyard, 58, British actress, Cavalcade, Gaslight
 June 27 – Mona Barrie, 54, British actress, Mystery Woman, Ladies Love Danger
 July 15 – Myles Connolly, 66, American screenwriter, State of the Union, Hans Christian Andersen
 July 26 – William A. Seiter, 73, American film director, The Beautiful and Damned, Sons of the Desert, Roberta
 August 5 – Charles Quigley, 58, American actor, The Shadow, The Game That Kills
August 6
Cedric Hardwicke, 71, British actor, Rope, Suspicion
Reed Howes, 64, American model and actor, The Dawn Rider, Paradise Canyon
 August 12 – Ian Fleming, 56, British author of James Bond novels, Chitty Chitty Bang Bang
 August 27 – Gracie Allen, 69, American comedy actress, A Damsel in Distress, The Big Broadcast of 1936
 September 23 – Fred M. Wilcox, 56, American director, Forbidden Planet, Lassie Come Home
 September 28 
Harpo Marx, 75, American comedy actor (The Marx Brothers), Duck Soup, A Night at the Opera
Nacio Herb Brown, 68, American songwriter and composer, The Broadway Melody, Glorifying the American Girl
 October 10 – Eddie Cantor, 72, American actor, singer, comedian, Whoopee!, Kid Millions
 October 15 – Cole Porter, 73, American composer and songwriter, Night and Day, High Society
 October 19 – Russ Brown, American actor, Damn Yankees, Anatomy of a Murder
 October 22 – Whip Wilson, 53, American actor, Night Raiders
 October 23 – Jo Swerling, 71, American screenwriter, It's a Wonderful Life, Guys and Dolls
 October 27 – Rudolph Maté, 66, Hungarian cinematographer and director, D.O.A., When Worlds Collide
 November 10 – Sam Newfield, 64, American director, The Terror of Tiny Town, I Accuse My Parents
 November 22 – George Tomasini, 55, American film editor, Psycho, Rear Window
 December 11 – Percy Kilbride, 76, American actor, The Southerner, State Fair
 December 14 – William Bendix, 58, American actor, Lifeboat, Detective Story
 December 31 – Gertrude Michael, 53, American actress, Murder at the Vanities, Women in Bondage

Film debuts 
Jenny Agutter – East of Sudan
The Beatles – A Hard Day's Night
Jim Brown – Rio Conchos
Ellen Burstyn – For Those Who Think Young
David Carradine – Taggart
Johnny Carson – Looking for Love
Tim Conway – McHale's Navy
Dom DeLuise – Diary of a Bachelor
Judi Dench – The Third Secret
Olympia Dukakis – Twice a Man
Morgan Freeman – The Pawnbroker
Elliott Gould – Quick, Let's Get Married
Clu Gulager – The Killers
James Earl Jones – Dr. Strangelove
Charlotte Rampling – A Hard Day's Night
Roy Scheider – The Curse of the Living Corpse
Raquel Welch – A House Is Not a Home

References

 
Film by year